January 25 - Eastern Orthodox liturgical calendar - January 27

All fixed commemorations below are observed on February 8 by Eastern Orthodox Churches on the Old Calendar.

For January 26th, Orthodox Churches on the Old Calendar commemorate the Saints listed on January 13.

Saints
 Martyrs Ananias the priest, Peter the prison guard, and seven soldiers, in Phoenicia (295)
 The Holy Two Martys of Phrygia.
 Venerable Ammon of Egypt (350), disciple of St. Anthony the Great.
 Venerable Symeon "the Ancient" of Mount Sinai (ca. 390)
 Saint Paula of Rome (Paula of Palestine), monastic foundress in Palestine (404)
 Venerable Gabriel, Abbot of the monastery of Saint Stephanos in Jerusalem (ca. 490)
 Venerable Xenophon and his wife Mary, and their two sons Sts. Arcadius and John, of Constantinople (6th century)

Pre-Schism Western saints
 Saint Conon, Bishop and monastic founder on the Isle of Man (648)
 Saint Theofrid (Theofroy), a monk at Luxeuil in France who became Abbot of Corbie, and a Bishop (ca. 690)
 Saint Athanasius, honoured as a bishop in Sorrento in the south of Italy.
 Saint Alphonsus of Astorga, Bishop of Astorga in Spain (9th century)
 Saint Ansurius (Aduri, Asurius, Isauri), Bishop of Orense in Galicia (925)

Post-Schism Orthodox saints
 Venerable Clement of Mt. Sagmation (1111)
 Saint David the Builder (David III), King of Georgia (1125)
 Venerable Xenophon, Abbot of Robeika (Novgorod) (1262)
 Venerable Arcadius of Vyaznikovsky (1592)
 Saint Joseph (Naniescu) of Suceava, Metropolitan of Moldova, Romania (1902)

New martyrs and confessors
 New Nun-martyr Matushka Maria (Lelyanova) of Gatchina (1932) (see also: April 4)
 New Hieromartyr Cyril, Metropolitan of Kazan (1937)
 New Hieromartyr Arcadius (1938)
 Martyr John Popov (1938)

Other commemorations
 Commemoration of the Great Earthquake at Constantinople (447-448), during the reign of Emperor Theodosius II (r. 408–450).
 Translation of the relics (845) of Sts. Theodore the Confessor, Abbot of the Studion (826), and his brother Joseph the Confessor, Archbishop of Thessalonica (832)
 Repose of Metropolitan Gabriel of Novgorod and St. Petersburg (1801)

Icon gallery

Notes

References

Sources
 January 26 / February 8. Orthodox Calendar (PRAVOSLAVIE.RU).
 February 8 / January 26. HOLY TRINITY RUSSIAN ORTHODOX CHURCH (A parish of the Patriarchate of Moscow).
 January 26. OCA - The Lives of the Saints.
 The Autonomous Orthodox Metropolia of Western Europe and the Americas (ROCOR). St. Hilarion Calendar of Saints for the year of our Lord 2004. St. Hilarion Press (Austin, TX). p. 10.
 January 26. Latin Saints of the Orthodox Patriarchate of Rome.
 The Roman Martyrology. Transl. by the Archbishop of Baltimore. Last Edition, According to the Copy Printed at Rome in 1914. Revised Edition, with the Imprimatur of His Eminence Cardinal Gibbons. Baltimore: John Murphy Company, 1916. pp. 26–27.
 Rev. Richard Stanton. A Menology of England and Wales, or, Brief Memorials of the Ancient British and English Saints Arranged According to the Calendar, Together with the Martyrs of the 16th and 17th Centuries. London: Burns & Oates, 1892. p. 36.
Greek Sources
 Great Synaxaristes:  26 ΙΑΝΟΥΑΡΙΟΥ. ΜΕΓΑΣ ΣΥΝΑΞΑΡΙΣΤΗΣ.
  Συναξαριστής. 26 Ιανουαρίου. ECCLESIA.GR. (H ΕΚΚΛΗΣΙΑ ΤΗΣ ΕΛΛΑΔΟΣ). 
Russian Sources
  8 февраля (26 января). Православная Энциклопедия под редакцией Патриарха Московского и всея Руси Кирилла (электронная версия). (Orthodox Encyclopedia - Pravenc.ru).
  26 января (ст.ст.) 8 февраля 2013 (нов. ст.). Русская Православная Церковь Отдел внешних церковных связей. (DECR).

January in the Eastern Orthodox calendar